Gustave Vereecken (born 7 August 1913) was a Belgian basketball player. He competed in the men's tournament at the 1936 Summer Olympics.

References

External links
  

1913 births
Year of death missing
Belgian men's basketball players
Olympic basketball players of Belgium
Basketball players at the 1936 Summer Olympics
Place of birth missing